Budde Jan Peter Maria "Bud" Brocken (born 12 September 1957) is a Dutch former professional footballer who played for Willem II, Birmingham City, FC Groningen and FC Den Bosch, as well as the Dutch national team, as a winger.

Club career
Brocken played for hometown amateur side LONGA and RKTVV, before joining professional side Willem II aged 17.

International career
Brocken made his debut for the Netherlands in a September 1983 Euro qualification match against Iceland and earned a total of 5 caps, scoring no goals. His final international was a December 1983 Euro 1984 qualification match against Malta.

Personal life
Brocken works as a real estate agent in his hometown Tilburg.

References

1957 births
Living people
Footballers from Tilburg
Dutch footballers
Netherlands international footballers
Willem II (football club) players
Birmingham City F.C. players
FC Groningen players
FC Den Bosch players
Eredivisie players
English Football League players
Association football wingers
Dutch expatriate footballers
Dutch expatriate sportspeople in England
Expatriate footballers in England